Father of the Bird is a 1997 traditionally animated Looney Tunes short film directed and co-produced by Stephen A. Fossati and produced by Chuck Jones and Linda Jones Clough starring Sylvester. This short only had a limited theatrical release and was the only Sylvester short produced by Jones, and also the final Sylvester cartoon he was involved with. It was also the final Looney Tunes/Merrie Melodies short to have Jones involved in and to use traditional cel animation.

Plot
Sylvester finds a sparrow egg in a nest. Before he can eat it for breakfast however, a little bird hatches out and calls him "Mama." He warms to the idea of being a father and instead of eating it, he protects the bird throughout a series of near-disasters.

References

External links

 
 

1997 short films
1997 comedy films
1997 animated films
1990s American animated films
1990s children's comedy films
1990s children's animated films
1990s animated short films
1990s buddy comedy films
1990s English-language films
1990s Warner Bros. animated short films
American children's animated comedy films
American animated short films
American buddy comedy films
Animated buddy films
Looney Tunes shorts
Sylvester the Cat films
Animated films about birds
Animated films about friendship
Animated films set in the United States
Films set in 1997
Spring (season) in culture
Warner Bros. Cartoons animated short films
Animated films about cats